Sphaeroma is a genus of aquatic isopod crustaceans, part of the family Sphaeromatidae.

Species 
 Sphaeroma annandalei
 Sphaeroma bigranulatum
 Sphaeroma boryi
 Sphaeroma conglobator
 Sphaeroma curtum
 Sphaeroma dumerilii
 Sphaeroma emarginatum
 Sphaeroma exosphaeroma
 Sphaeroma felix
 Sphaeroma gasparellai
 Sphaeroma gayi
 Sphaeroma globicauda
 Sphaeroma granti
 Sphaeroma intermedium
 Sphaeroma laevigatum
 Sphaeroma laurensi
 Sphaeroma mukaii
 Sphaeroma papillae
 Sphaeroma pentodon
 Sphaeroma peruvianum
 Sphaeroma plumosa
 Sphaeroma podicipitis
 Sphaeroma prideauxianum
 Sphaeroma propinqua
 Sphaeroma quadridentatum
 Sphaeroma quoianum 
 Sphaeroma retrolaeve
 Sphaeroma rotundicaudum
 Sphaeroma serratum
 Sphaeroma shimantoensis
 Sphaeroma sieboldii
 Sphaeroma silvai
 Sphaeroma sinensis
 Sphaeroma terebrans
 Sphaeroma tomentosum
 Sphaeroma triste
 Sphaeroma tuberculata
 Sphaeroma tuberculatum
 Sphaeroma wadai
 Sphaeroma walkeri
 Sphaeroma venustissimum

Sources

Links
 

Sphaeromatidae